Anita Rapp-Ødegaard (born 24 July 1977) is a former Norwegian footballer and Olympic champion.

She debuted for the Norway women's national football team in 1998, and played 62 matches for the national team. She was on the gold medal-winning team at the 2000 Summer Olympics in Sydney.

She played for Oakland University from 1997 to 2001.

References

External links 
 
 Anita Rapp – Women's Soccer – Oakland University Athletics
 Anita Rapp, Oakland (Women's Soccer) – The Summit League

1977 births
Living people
Norwegian women's footballers
Footballers at the 2000 Summer Olympics
Olympic footballers of Norway
Olympic gold medalists for Norway
Expatriate women's soccer players in the United States
Olympic medalists in football
Asker Fotball (women) players
FK Donn players
Toppserien players
New York Power players
Medalists at the 2000 Summer Olympics
Norway women's international footballers
Oakland Golden Grizzlies women's soccer players
Women's association football defenders
1999 FIFA Women's World Cup players
2003 FIFA Women's World Cup players
Sportspeople from Lillehammer
Women's United Soccer Association players